The Metropolitan Medical Center College of Arts, Science and Technology or (MMC-CAST) is a school of nursing located in Santa Cruz, Manila, Philippines. It was founded in 1976, and is owned and operated by the United Doctors Association, which is an affiliate of the Metropolitan Medical Center.

Education in Santa Cruz, Manila
Educational institutions established in 1976
Universities and colleges in Manila
1976 establishments in the Philippines